Inderpal Singh (born 2 March 1975) is an Indian rower. He competed in the men's coxless pair event at the 2000 Summer Olympics.

References

External links
 

1975 births
Living people
Indian male rowers
Olympic rowers of India
Rowers at the 2000 Summer Olympics
Place of birth missing (living people)
Asian Games medalists in rowing
Rowers at the 2002 Asian Games
Asian Games bronze medalists for India
Medalists at the 2002 Asian Games
Recipients of the Arjuna Award